Lisle may refer to:

Music
 Lisle (band)

People
 Baron Lisle
 Viscount Lisle

Lisle is a last name of Norman origin.
 Lady Alice Lisle (1617–1685), member of the English nobility
 Edward Lisle (1692–1753), English landowner and politician
 Harriet Lisle (1717–1794), English painter
 Jim Lisle, Australian rugby footballer
 Raymond Lisle (1910–1994), American attorney, officer in the US Foreign Service, and Dean of Brooklyn Law School
 Sel Lisle, Australian rugby league footballer
 Vanessa de Lisle, British fashion journalist

Also: surname Leconte de Lisle:
 Charles Marie René Leconte de Lisle (1818–1894), French poet

Places
Australia
Lisle, Tasmania

France
Lisle, Dordogne
Lisle, Loir-et-Cher
Lisle-en-Barrois, in the Meuse département
Lisle-en-Rigault, in the Meuse département
Lisle-sur-Tarn, in the Tarn département
Obsolete spelling of Lille

United States
Lisle, Illinois
Lisle, Missouri
Lisle (town), New York
Lisle (village), New York

Other uses
Cotton lisle, a strong, durable, finely-spun cotton
Lisle Corporation

See also
 Delisle (disambiguation)
 Lyall (disambiguation)
 Lyell (disambiguation)
 Lyle (disambiguation)